Zevgolateio (Ζευγολατειό)  or  Zevgolatio (Ζευγολατιό) may refer to the following places in Greece:

Zevgolateio, a town in Corinthia
Zevgolateio, Arcadia, a village in Arcadia
Zevgolateio, Messenia, a village in the municipal unit Meligalas, Messenia
Zevgolatio, the former name of Eliki, a village in Achaea
Zevgolatio, Serres, a village in the municipal unit Strymoniko, Serres regional unit